The Fair Lawn Public Schools are a comprehensive community public school district serving students in kindergarten through twelfth grade from Fair Lawn in Bergen County, New Jersey, United States.

As of the 2018–19 school year, the district, comprised of nine schools, had an enrollment of 5,138 students and 409.5 classroom teachers (on an FTE basis), for a student–teacher ratio of 12.5:1.

The district is classified by the New Jersey Department of Education as being in District Factor Group "GH", the third-highest of eight groupings. District Factor Groups organize districts statewide to allow comparison by common socioeconomic characteristics of the local districts. From lowest socioeconomic status to highest, the categories are A, B, CD, DE, FG, GH, I and J.

Awards and recognition
In both the 1990-91 and 1997-98 school years, Fair Lawn High School received the National Blue Ribbon Award of Excellence from the United States Department of Education, the highest honor that an American school can achieve. 

In 2016, Lyncrest Elementary School was one of ten schools in New Jersey recognized as a National Blue Ribbon School by the United States Department of Education, a recognition celebrating excellence in academics.

Henry B. Milnes Elementary School was one of nine schools in New Jersey honored in 2020 by the National Blue Ribbon Schools Program.

History
In December 2014, Fair Lawn voters approved by a greater than 2-to-1 margin a $12.8 million expansion and capital improvement referendum to be implemented by the Fair Lawn Public Schools that includes roof repairs to several school buildings and added classrooms to enable the initiation of full-day kindergarten.

Schools
Schools in the district (with 2018–19 enrollment data from the National Center for Education Statistics.) are:
Elementary schools
John A. Forrest Elementary School (286 students; grades K-4)
Damon Placenti, Principal
Lyncrest Elementary School (263; K-4)
Kelly Diee, Principal
Henry B. Milnes Elementary School (497; K-4)
Joseph Fulco, Principal
Radburn Elementary School (457; K-4)
Jill Lindsay, Principal
Warren Point Elementary School (469; K-4)
Suzanne Gons, Principal
Westmoreland Elementary School (422; K-4)
Christine Dell'Aglio, Principal
Middle schools
Memorial Middle School (455; 5-8)
Nancy Schwindt, Principal
Thomas Jefferson Middle School (739; 5-8)
Michael Weaver, Principal
High school
Fair Lawn High School (1,490; 9-12)
Paul Gorski, Principal

Administration
Core members of the district's administration are:
Nicholas J. Norcia, Superintendent
John Serapiglia Jr., Business Administrator / Board Secretary

Board of education
The district's board of education, comprised of nine members, sets policy and oversees the fiscal and educational operation of the district through its administration. As a Type II school district, the board's trustees are elected directly by voters to serve three-year terms of office on a staggered basis, with three seats up for election each year held (since 2012) as part of the November general election. The board appoints a superintendent to oversee the district's day-to-day operations and a business administrator to supervise the business functions of the district.

References

External links 
Fair Lawn Public Schools

School Data for the Fair Lawn Public Schools, National Center for Education Statistics

Fair Lawn, New Jersey
School districts in Bergen County, New Jersey
New Jersey District Factor Group GH